The rivière du Petit Sault (English: Small Sault river) flows through the municipalities of Saint-Éloi (MRC Les Basques Regional County Municipality) and L'Isle-Verte (MRC of Rivière-du-Loup Regional County Municipality), in the administrative region of Bas-Saint-Laurent, in Quebec, in Canada.

The Petit Sault River is a tributary of the southeastern coast of the St. Lawrence River at the L'Isle-Verte.

Geography 
The Petit Sault river takes its source from agricultural streams located in the municipality of Saint-Éloi.

From its source, the Petits Saults river flows in an agricultural zone over  according to the following segments:
  west in Saint-Éloi, to chemin du 3e rang East;
  north-west, up to the 2e rang East road;
  north-west, to the limit of the municipality of L'Isle-Verte (Saint-Jean-Baptiste-de-l'Isle-Verte sector);
  heading west, crossing highway 20, to route de la Station;
  westward, collecting water from a stream (coming from the south), to Pettigrew Road;
  northwesterly, crossing the Canadian National railway line and route 132, to its confluence.

Toponymy 
The toponym "rivière du Petit Sault" was made official on December 4, 1980, at the Commission de toponymie du Québec.

References 

Rivers of Bas-Saint-Laurent